Misión Santo Domingo was founded among the Kiliwa Indians of Baja California, Mexico, by the Dominicans Miguel Hidalgo and Manuel García in 1775. It is located near Colonia Vicente Guerrero and northeast of San Quintín Bay.

History
The first site of the mission was about 13 kilometers east of the coast, but the water supply proved to be inadequate. The mission was moved about 4 kilometers farther east in 1793. The native population dwindled under the impacts of Old World diseases, and after about 1821 the site ceased to be served by a resident priest. Ruined adobe walls survive to attest the mission's former presence.

See also
Spanish missions in Baja California

References
 Magaña, Mario Alberto. 1998. Población y misiones de Baja California: estudio histórico demográfico de la misión de Santo Domingo de la Frontero, 1775–1850. El Colegio de la Frontera Norte, Tijuana, Mexico.
 Meigs, Peveril, III. 1935. The Dominican Mission Frontier of Lower California. University of California Publications in Geography No. 7. Berkeley.
 Vernon, Edward W. 2002. Las Misiones Antiguas: The Spanish Missions of Baja California, 1683–1855. Viejo Press, Santa Barbara, California.

Domingo
Landmarks in Ensenada
1775 establishments in New Spain